Judson Hill (born December 17, 1959) is an American politician. He is a former member of the Georgia State Senate from the 32nd district, serving from 2005 until 2017. He is a member of the Republican Party.

On November 30, 2016, Hill announced that he would run for the United States House of Representatives in Georgia's 6th congressional district special election, 2017, to succeed Tom Price.  Hill resigned from the Georgia Senate upon qualifying on February 13, for the special election held on April 18, 2017. Hill placed 5th in the election with a vote percentage count of 8.8% and was not able to proceed into the run-off election held on June 20, 2017.

References

External links

Official campaign website 

Living people
Republican Party Georgia (U.S. state) state senators
1959 births
Place of birth missing (living people)
21st-century American politicians
Emory University alumni